During the Dutch Revolt (1568–1648), the Dunkirkers or Dunkirk Privateers were commerce raiders in the service of the Spanish monarchy. They were also part of the Dunkirk fleet, which consequently was a part of the Spanish monarchy's Flemish fleet (Armada de Flandes). The Dunkirkers operated from the ports of the Flemish coast: Nieuwpoort, Ostend, and Dunkirk. Throughout the Eighty Years' War, the fleet of the Dutch Republic repeatedly tried to destroy the Dunkirkers. The first Dunkirkers sailed a group of warships outfitted by the Spanish government, but non-government investment in privateering soon led to a more numerous fleet of privately owned and outfitted warships.

Origins and function
Dunkirk was in the hands of the Dutch rebels from 1577 until 1583, when Alexander Farnese, Duke of Parma re-established the sovereignty of his uncle Philip II of Spain as count of Flanders. Dunkirk was, at the time, an important, strategically positioned port with its approaches shielded by sandbanks. In 1583, Parma assembled a small royal squadron of warships to destroy Dutch naval trade and fisheries. However, it did not take long before the Habsburg authorities in the Low Countries began issuing letters of Marque, and privately owned warships filled the ranks of the Dunkirkers. These privately owned warships were known in Dutch as the particulieren, to distinguish them from the royal warships that were also part of the fleet. At their peak, the Dunkirkers operated about a hundred warships. The crews were mostly made up of Flemish and Walloon sailors, Spaniards and many individuals from the northern Netherlands and other nearby European countries. Apart from targeting trade and fishing, the royal squadron was often used to convoy troops between Spain and the Spanish Netherlands.

Effectiveness
Despite a near constant blockade of the Dunkirkers' ports by Dutch warships, the privateers routinely managed to evade the blockaders and inflict much damage to Dutch shipping. Though the Dutch at times prevented the Dunkirkers from reaching open sea, during the winter months the blockade was extremely difficult to maintain and permitted virtually free passage. Sometimes naval battles ensued when privateers tried to break out or when Dutch warships tried to destroy the privateers in their harbours. During one of these Dutch attacks, the Dutch folk hero Piet Pieterszoon Hein, famous for capturing a Spanish treasure fleet, was killed. The Dutch declared the Dunkirk privateers pirates in 1587; captains of Dutch naval vessels had to swear an oath that they would throw or beat all prisoners from Dunkirk warships into the sea (euphemistically known as voetenspoelen, "washing the feet"). Due to its excessive harshness and the fact that it provoked equally cruel retributions from the side of the privateers, this standing order was very unpopular with Dutch crews and the general public. The order was often evaded by putting Dunkirk seamen off on one of the many shallow shoals off the Flemish coast from which they could wade to dry land.

The Dunkirkers had an extremely wide range for their era. Although mainly operating in and around the Channel, they also sailed near the Danish and German coastal areas to intercept Dutch ships returning from the Baltic, and operated in Spanish and Mediterranean waters. They cooperated closely with the Spanish navy, for instance, in the Battle of the Downs. This combined effort reached a peak of effectiveness during the time the Eighty Years' War merged with the Thirty Years' War. To evade the Dutch navy the Dunkirk admiralty had a special type of small and very maneuverable warship constructed, the frigate. Frigate-like ship types were soon adopted by other navies and still have their modern-day counterparts.

In 1600 the Dutch sent an army to conquer the city of Dunkirk and stop the privateering once and for all. The Dutch invasion force clashed with a Spanish army and although the Dutch won the resulting Battle of Nieuwpoort the Dutch commander, stadtholder Maurits of Nassau, realised his lines were dangerously over-stretched and so turned back to the Republic. The Flemish Fleet continued to be especially damaging to the herring fisheries of Holland and Zeeland, almost completely wiping out the sector on several occasions. However, Dutch merchantmen proved far more valuable targets, sometimes vessels on their way back from Russia or as far as the Indies were captured, along with their valuable cargoes.

After 1621, when the Twelve Years' Truce ended, the Dunkirkers captured on average 229 merchantmen and fishing vessels per year from the Dutch. By 1628, they had also seized 522 English vessels, primarily fishing boats but also ships carrying munitions and victuals to the Dutch. This was one of the major concerns of Charles I's diplomatic representative in Brussels, Sir Balthasar Gerbier, who eventually managed to have tobacco taken off the list of 'victuals'. One of the most successful raiders of this period was Jacob Collaert. It was not until October 1646, when the French captured Dunkirk with Dutch naval support, that the danger from the privateers was greatly reduced.  In 1652, Spanish forces recaptured the city and the Dunkirkers once again became a major threat.  The Dunkirkers harassed English trade after England resumed hostilities against Spain in 1657, before Dunkirk was captured by a Franco-English force in 1658. Ostend then became their most important port. When, after 1672, France and the Dutch Republic became enemies, privateering activities were resumed at Dunkirk, this time for France, and this would last intermittently until 1712. A famous Dunkirk privateer from this period was Jean Bart.

Notes

References
 R.A. Stradling, The Armada of Flanders: Spanish Maritime Policy and European War, 1568–1668 (Cambridge Studies in Early Modern History; Cambridge University Press, 1992)  (issued in paperback 2004).
 J.R. Bruijn, C.B. Wels et al., Met Man en Macht, De Militaire Geschiedenis van Nederland 1550–2000, (Balans 2003), pp. 59–61: "Bestrijding van de Vlaamse Oorlogsvloot"
Virginia Lunsford. Piracy and Privateering in the Golden Age Netherlands, (Palgrave Macmillan 2005),

External links 
 Witte de With's Action with Dunkirkers off Nieuport, 1640

 
Military history of the Netherlands
Military history of France
Naval history
Privateering